Svenska Serien 1910, part of the 1910 Swedish football season, was the first Svenska Serien season played. Örgryte IS won the league ahead of runners-up AIK, while Göteborgs FF and Västmanland-Nerikes BK were relegated.

Participating clubs

League table

Promotions, relegations and qualifications

Results

References 

Print

Online

1910
1909–10 in European association football leagues
1910–11 in European association football leagues
1